Ceratarcha is a genus of moths of the family Crambidae. The genus was erected by Charles Swinhoe in 1894. Both species are found in the Indian state of Meghalaya.

Species
Ceratarcha clathralis C. Swinhoe, 1894
Ceratarcha umbrosa C. Swinhoe, 1894

References

Spilomelinae
Crambidae genera
Taxa named by Charles Swinhoe